Oli Mould is a British lecturer in human geography at Royal Holloway, University of London. His academic research, and his writing, focuses on the role of urban creativity, activism and politics.

Work
In his book Urban Subversion and the Creative City (2016), Mould demonstrates a very different way of thinking about creativity than that offered by the neoliberal city, "through a variety of subversive practices, from skateboarding and parkour, to urban explorations." The book is "filled with images and global examples".

In Against Creativity (2018), he questions Richard Florida's idea of the creative class, arguing that "much of what we call 'creative' today is not creative at all but rather cementing the status quo, forever in the service of capital, labor, and consumption."

In Seven Ethics Against Capitalism (2021), "Mould sets down seven ethics which, together, can be used to attack the beast: mutualism, transmaterialism, minoritarianism, decodification, slowness, failure and love."

Publications
Urban Subversion and the Creative City. Routledge, 2016. .
Against Creativity: Everything you have been told about creativity is wrong. Verso, 2018. .
Contra la creatividad. Capitalismo y domesticación del talento. Madrid: Fabeto, 2019. . Spanish-language version. Translated by Pablo Hermida Lazcano.
Seven Ethics Against Capitalism: Towards a Planetary Commons. Polity, 2021. .

References

External links
 

Academics of Royal Holloway, University of London
British writers
21st-century British male writers
British male non-fiction writers
Urban geographers
Living people
Year of birth missing (living people)
1980s births